Arkansas Highway 23 is a north–south state highway in north Arkansas. The route runs  from US 71 near Elm Park north to the Missouri state line through Ozark and Eureka Springs. Between AR 16 at Brashears and Interstate 40 north of Ozark, Highway 23 winds through the Ozark National Forest and is designated as the Pig Trail Scenic Byway due to its steep hills and hairpin turns. The route has a strong connection with the University of Arkansas Razorbacks, connecting fans in Central Arkansas with the Northwest Arkansas area.

Route description

AR 23 begins at US 71 near Elm Park and runs northeast to Booneville. The route intersects AR 116 south of Booneville then crosses AR 10 in Booneville before continuing north into Franklin County. AR 23 travels through the Ouachita National Forest, winding through mountains and through thick woods.

AR 23 eventually meets AR 22 in Caulksville and AR 41 near Chismville after which the route runs north across the Arkansas River to Ozark. AR 23 meets US 64 in downtown Ozark and I-40 north of town. The route next enters Ozark National Forest. AR 23 meets AR 16 north of the forest west St. Paul where the two roads run concurrent.

Northeast of St Paul, AR 23 and AR 16 split and AR 23 continues north through Madison County, meeting AR 74 south of Huntsville and US 412 BUS in Huntsville. North of town, AR 23 crosses US 412. AR 23 next passes Withrow Springs State Park, AR 127 and AR 12 before intersecting US 62 in Eureka Springs. AR 23 and US 62 have a short concurrency before 23 turns north passing AR 187 near Holiday Island before terminating at SSR-P at the Missouri state line.

Major intersections
Mile markers reset at concurrencies.

Huntsville city route
Arkansas Highway 23C (AR 23C) is an unsigned city route in Huntsville. The route is  beginning at AR 23. It travels north and turns east, continuing west as U.S. Route 412B (US 412B). After briefly traveling to the east, the highway terminates at AR 23 near the beginning of a concurrency with US 412.

Highway 23W

Its southern terminus is at AR 23 south of Withrow Springs State Park. The highway serves as the primary north–south access road to the state park.

See also

References

External links

023
Transportation in Scott County, Arkansas
Transportation in Logan County, Arkansas
Transportation in Franklin County, Arkansas
Transportation in Madison County, Arkansas
Transportation in Carroll County, Arkansas